Godley is a suburb of Hyde, Greater Manchester, England.

The area formed part of the municipal borough of Hyde in Cheshire from 1881 to 1974, when it became part of the metropolitan borough of Tameside.

The earliest recorded agriculture in Tameside east of the River Tame was in Godley, from 1211–1249.

In 1851, Godley Reservoir was completed.

Industry
In the early 1880s, John Broomer developed an early form of margarine called Butterine. He established a factory in the Olive Tree works, a former hat factory on Mottram Road previously occupied by Henry Taylor Wrigley.  In 1888, the Danish margarine manufacturer Otto Monsted acquired the Olive Tree works. The factory was sold to Maypole Dairies in 1902 and later used by Walls to manufacture ice cream and meat products.

Transport
Godley is served by Godley railway station, which replaced the nearby Godley East railway station.

References
Notes

Bibliography

Areas of Greater Manchester
Geography of Tameside
Hyde, Greater Manchester